The Onygenaceae are a family of fungi in the Ascomycota, class Eurotiomycetes.

Genera
These are the genera that are in the Onygenaceae, according to a 2021 review of fungal classification. Following the genus name is the taxonomic authority (those who first circumscribed the genus; standardized author abbreviations are used), year of publication, and the estimated number of species.

 Amauroascus  – 15 spp.
 Aphanoascus  – 18 spp.
 Apinisia  – 3 spp.
 Arachnotheca  – 1 sp.
 Ascocalvatia  – 1 sp.
 Auxarthron  – 13 spp.
 Auxarthronopsis  – 2 spp.
 Bifidocarpus  – 2 spp.
 Byssoonygena  – 1 sp.
 Canomyces  – 1 sp.
 Castanedomyces  – 1 sp.
 Chlamydosauromyces  – 1 sp.
 Chrysosporium  – 66 spp.
 Coccidioides  – 6 spp.
 Currahomyces  – 1 sp.
 Kuehniella  – 2 spp.
 Leucothecium  – 3 spp.
 Malbranchea  – 23 spp.
 Myotisia  – 1 sp.
 Myriodontium   – 1 sp.
 Neoarachnotheca  – 1 sp.
 Neogymnomyces  – 2 spp.
 Onygena  – 10 spp.
 Ophidiomyces  – 1 sp.
 Paranannizziopsis  – 4 spp.
 Pectinotrichum  – 2 spp.
 Polytolypa  – 2 spp.
 Pseudoamauroascus  – 1 sp.
 Renispora  – 2 spp.
 Testudomyces  – 2 spp.
 Uncinocarpus  – 2 spp.
 Xanthothecium  – 1 sp.

References

Onygenales
Ascomycota families
Taxa named by Miles Joseph Berkeley
Taxa described in 1857